Pocono Manor Historic District is a national historic district located in Pocono Township and Tobyhanna Township, Monroe County, Pennsylvania. It encompasses 75 contributing buildings, 1 contributing site, 4 contributing structures, and 4 contributing objects on the historic resort of Pocono Manor.

History
The resort community was established in 1902, and includes an Inn, recreational complex, and dependent cottage community. The cottage community was originally developed by Quakers and the cottages reflect popular early-20th-century architectural styles including Stick/Eastlake, Shingle Style, and Bungalow / American Craftsman.

The Pocono Manor Inn was built in nine sections between 1902 and 1949. The seven earliest sections, built between 1902 and 1926, were designed by noted Philadelphia architect Walter Smedley.

This historic district was added to the National Register of Historic Places in 1997.

The Inn at Pocono Manor was burned down following a wind driven fire around 6:30am on November 2, 2019. The exact cause of the fire is unknown.

References

External links

Pocono Manor Inn website

Historic districts on the National Register of Historic Places in Pennsylvania
Buildings and structures in Monroe County, Pennsylvania
National Register of Historic Places in Monroe County, Pennsylvania